Plummet Glacier is the westernmost glacier on the north side of Kukri Hills, flowing north to Taylor Glacier, in Victoria Land. The name is one of a group in the area associated with surveying applied in 1993 by New Zealand Geographic Board (NZGB). The name refers to a plummet, or plumb bob.

Glaciers of Victoria Land
McMurdo Dry Valleys